This is a list of women artists who were born in Germany or whose artworks are closely associated with that country.

A
Louise Abel (1841–1907), German-born Norwegian photographer 
Tomma Abts (born 1967), abstract painter 
Elisabeth von Adlerflycht (1775–1846), painter 
Anni Albers (1899–1994), German-American textile artist, printmaker
Nykolai Aleksander (born 1978), digital artist 
Elisabeth Andrae (1876–1945), painter 
Annot (1894–1981), painter, art teacher, writer, pacifist 
Clara Arnheim (1865–1942), painter 
Ulrike Arnold (born 1950), artist 
Ursula Arnold (1929–2012), photographer
Irene Awret (1921–2014), artist, author and Holocaust survivor 
Eva Aschoff (1900–1969), visual artist

B
Johanna Juliana Friederike Bacciarelli (1733–1809 or later), miniaturist, pastelist and court painter
Elvira Bach (born 1951), painter
Bele Bachem (1916–2005), graphic artists, illustrator, stage designer and writer
Nina Lola Bachhuber (born 1971), sculptor, installation artist, artist
Carola Baer-von Mathes (1857–1940), painter
Alma del Banco (1862–1943), modernist painter
Tina Bara (born 1962), photographer
Caroline Bardua (1781–1864), painter
Uta Barth (born 1958), photographer
Carla Bartheel (1902–1983), actress and photographer
Jeanna Bauck (1840–1926), painter
Karin Baumeister-Rehm (born 1971), painter
Mary Baumeister (born 1934), artist
Hilla Becher (1934–2015), photographer
Katharina Behrend (1888–1973), photographer
Gisela Beker (1932–2015), German-American painter
Sibylle Bergemann (1941–2010), photographer
Karin Baumeister-Rehm (1881–1964), painter and opera singer 
Luise Begas-Parmentier (1843–1920), painter
Olga Beggrow-Hartmann (1862–1922), German/Russian, painter
Julia Behr (fl.1865–1890s), portrait painter
Amalie Bensinger (1809–1889), religious painter
Charlotte Berend-Corinth (1880–1967), painter
Josefa Berens-Totenohl (1891–1969), writer and painter
Ella Bergmann-Michel (1896–1971), abstract painter, photographer, filmmaker 
Ruth Bernhard (1905–2006), German-born American photographer
Lis Beyer (1906–1973), textile artist
Hanna Bieber-Böhm (1851–1910), painter
Aenne Biermann (1898–1933), photographer
Ilse Bing (1899–1998), avant-garde photographer 
Frieda Blell (1874–1951), landscape painter
Anna Katharina Block (1642–1719), flower painter
Anna Blume (1937–2020), photographer
Bärbel Bohley (1945–2010), artist, East German opposition figure
Cosima von Bonin (born 1962), contemporary artist
Paula Bonte (1840–1902), painter
Madeleine Boschan (born 1979), sculptor 
Jenny Bossard-Biow (1813–c. 1858), photographer 
Pola Brändle (born 1980), collage artist
Kerstin Brätsch (born 1979), contemporary artist
Marianne Breslauer (1909–2001), photographer
Dora Bromberger (1881–1942), painter
Theresia Anna Maria von Brühl (1784–1844), pastellist
Hede Bühl (born 1940), sculptor
Elisabeth Büchsel (1867–1957), painter
Andrea Büttner (born 1972), multi-medium artist

C
Maria Caspar-Filser (1878–1968), painter
Dorothea Chandelle (1784–1866), painter
Suzanne Chodowiecka (1763–1819), painter
Claricia (fl. c.1200), manuscript illuminator
Penelope Cleyn (fl. 1668–1677), miniaturist
Helene Cramer (1844–1916), painter
Molly Cramer (1852–1936), painter
Helga von Cramm (1840–1919), painter, illustrator and graphic artist
Alice Creischer (born 1960), artist, writer and theorist

D
Anna Dabis (1847–1927), sculptor
Hanne Darboven (1941–2009), conceptual artist
Gabriela Dauerer (born 1958), contemporary painter
Marie Davids (1847–1905), painter
Wanda von Debschitz-Kunowski (1870–1935), portrait photographer
Paula Deppe (1886–1922), painter, engraver and illustrator
Selma Des Coudres (1883–1956), painter
Christa Dichgans (1940–2018), painter
Adelheid Dietrich (1827–1891), still life painter
Minya Diez-Dührkoop (1873–1929), photographer
Barbara Regina Dietzsch (1706–1773), painter and engraver
Jacqueline Diffring (1920–2020), sculptor 
Christel Drillbohrer (born 1956), painter, installation artist 
Sophie Dinglinger (1736–1791), painter
Louise Droste-Roggemann (1865–1945), painter
Inge Druckrey (born 1940), graphic designer and educator
Tatjana Doll (born 1970), contemporary painter
Dr. Gindi (born 1965), sculptor
Louise Droste-Roggemann (1865–1945), painter
Ruth Duckworth (1919–2009), German-American sculptor and ceramist

E
Julie von Egloffstein (1792–1869), painter
Marli Ehrman (1904–1982), German-born American textile artist
Michaela Eichwald (born 1967), painter
Elisabeth von Eicken (1862–1940), landscape painter
Frauke Eigen (born 1969), photographer
Marie Ellenrieder (1791–1863), painter
Clara Ewald (1859–1948), painter

F
Gertrude Fehr (1895–1996), photographer
Anke Feuchtenberger (born 1963), painter, comics artist
Adele von Finck (1879–1943), painter 
Elsa Fraenkel (1892–1975), sculptor
Maria Elektrine von Freyberg (1797–1847), painter
Elsa von Freytag-Loringhoven (1874–1927), avant-garde artist, poet
Mathilde Freiin von Freytag-Loringhoven (1860–1941), painter, writer
Eva Frankfurther (1930–1959), painter
Caroline Friederike Friedrich (1749–1815), flower painter
Katharina Fritsch (born 1956), sculptor
Helene Funke (1869–1957), painter and graphic designer

G
Edith Galliner (1914–2000), painter, potter
Anna Rosina de Gasc (1713–1783), portrait painter
Sylke von Gaza (born 1966), abstract painter
Anna Margarethe Geiger (1783–1809), pastellist
Senta Geißler (1902–2000), painter
Isa Genzken (born 1948), contemporary artist
Ida Gerhardi (1862–1927), painter
Anna Gerresheim (1852–1921), painter, etcher
Helga Goetze (1922–2008), embroiderer, poet, activist
Hilde Goldschmidt (1897–1980), painter and printmaker
Marie Goslich (1859–1936), photographer and journalist
Sophia Goudstikker (1865–1924), Dutch-born German photographer and feminist
Dorothea Maria Graff (1678–1743), painter
Catrin G. Grosse (born 1964), painter, graphic designer and sculptor 
Katharina Grosse (born 1968), artist
Rita Grosse-Ruyken (born 1948), contemporary artist
Annelie Grund (born 1953), glass artist
Sabina Grzimek (born 1942), sculptor
Julia Gunther (born 1979), photographer and documentary cinematographer

H
Lisel Haas (1898–1989), theatre photographer
Ilse Häfner-Mode (1902–1973), German-Jewish artist
Esther Haase (born 1966), photographer and film director
Godela Habel (1929–2022), painter
Sarah Haffner (1940–2018), German-British painter and writer
Ilse Häfner-Mode (1902–1973), German-Jewish painter
Julie Wilhelmine Hagen-Schwarz (1824–1902), portrait painter
Marie Hager (1872–1947), painter
Magda Hagstotz (1914–2001), abstract painter
Henriette Hahn-Brinckmann (1862–1934), painter and lithographer
Tina Haim-Wentscher (1887–1974), (aka Tina Haim-Wentcher), German-Australian sculptress
Andrea Hanak (born 1969), painter
Sandra Hastenteufel (born 1966), contemporary artist
Iris Häussler (born 1971), German-born Canadian conceptual, installation artist 
Roswitha Hecke (born 1944), photographer
Elise Neumann Hedinger (1854–1923), painter
Susan Hefuna (born 1962), visual artist
Marta Hegemann (1894–1970), avant-garde painter
Catharina Elisabeth Heinecken (1683–1757), artist and alchemist
Bettina Heinen-Ayech (1937–2020), painter
Annemarie Heinrich (1912–2005), German-born Argentine photographer
Carola Helbing-Erben, textile artist
Amalia von Helvig (1776–1831), artist, writer, who moved to Sweden
Ingrid Hermentin (born 1951), computer graphic artist
Johanna Helena Herolt (1723–1868), botanical painter
Charline von Heyl (born 1960), German-American painter
 Lotte Herrlich (1883–1956), photographer of naturism
 Eva Hesse (1936–1970), German-born American sculptor
Vera Hilger (born 1971), painter
Dora Hitz (1856–1924), painter
Hannah Höch (1889–1978), avant-garde artist
Sophie Hoechstetter (1873–1943), painter, poet
Marta Hoepffner (1912–2000), photographer
Candida Höfer (born 1944), photographer
Margret Hofheinz-Döring (1910–1994), painter and graphic artist
Bettina Hohls (born 1947), artist and designer
Margarethe Hormuth-Kallmorgen (1857–1934), painter
Rebecca Horn (born 1944), installation artist
Sabine Hornig (born 1964), photographer
Maria Innocentia Hummel (1909–1946), nun, artist
Irma Hünerfauth (1907–1998), painter, sculptor and object artist
Ingeborg Hunzinger (1915–2009), sculptor
Auguste Hüssener (1789–1877), engraver and miniaturist
Walde Huth (1923–2011), photographer

J
Lotte Jacobi (1896–1990), German-American photographer
Ruth Jacobsen (1932–2019), German-born American artist, collages of the Holocaust
Hedwig Jarke (1882–1949), printmaker
Marie Jensen (1845–1921), painter
Charlotte Joël (1887–1943), photographer
Ilse Jonas (1884–1922), painter
Brigitte Jurack (born 1962), sculptor
Tina Juretzek (born 1952), painter

K
Amalie Kärcher (1819–1887), fruit and flower painter
Henriette Agnete Kitty von Kaulbach (1900–1992), German-Dutch painter
Johanna Keimeyer (born 1982), photographer, artist
Maria Countess von Kalckreuth (1857–1897), painter 
Annette Kelm (born 1975), contemporary artist, photographer
Marie von Keudell (1838–1918), painter  
Inge King (1915–2016), German-born Australian sculptor 
Astrid Kirchner (1938–2020), photographer, artist
Mary Louisa Kirschner (1852–1931), painter, glass artist
Johanna Kirsch (1856–1907), painter
Anna Klein (1883–1941), painter
Barbara Klemm (born 1939), press photographer
Gabriele Koch (born 1948), studio potter
Dora Koch-Stetter (1881–1968), (aka Dora Stetter), landscape artist, portrait painter and etcher
Käthe Kollwitz (1867–1945), painter, printmaker
Katrin Korfmann (born 1971), contemporary artist
Emma Körner (1788–1815), painter
Marianne Kraus (1765–1838), painter, travel writer
Susanne Kriemann (born 1972), artist, photographer
Magda Kröner (1854–1935), painter
Monika Kropshofer (born 1952), photographer
Christiane Kubrick (born 1932), actress, dancer, painter and singer
Germaine Krull (1897–1985), photographer, activist
Marianne Kühn (1914–2005), politician and painter
Susanne Kühn (born 1969), painter
Marie Kundt (1870–1932), photographer and educator
Marianne Kürzinger (1767–1809), history and genre painter
Barbara Kussinger (born 1970), painter

L
Lotte Laserstein (1898–1993), German-Swedish painter
Henni Lehmann (1862–1937), painter
Hildegard Lehnert (1857–1943), painter
Margaret Leiteritz (1907–1976), painter
Erna Lendvai-Dircksen (1883–1962), photographer
Sabine Lepsius (1864–1942), portrait painter
Esther Levine (born 1970), German-American photographer
Sophie Ley (1849–1918), painter
Emmy Lischke (1860–1919), painter
Clara Lobedan (1840–1918), painter
Elisabeth Loewe (1924–1996), Post-Expressionist painter
Käthe Loewenthal (1878–1942), painter
Christiane Löhr (born 1965), contemporary artist
Elfriede Lohse-Wächtler (1899–1940), avant-garde artist
Margarethe Loewe-Bethe (1859–1932), painter
Käthe Loewenthal (1878–1942), painter
Louise Hollandine of the Palatinate (1622–1709), painter and abbess
Auguste Ludwig (1834–1901), painter 
Almuth Lütkenhaus (1930–1996), sculptor
Loretta Lux (born 1969), photographer
Rut Blees Luxemburg (born 1967), photographer
Vilma Lwoff-Parlaghy (1863–1923), painter

M
Hilke MacIntyre, contemporary ceramist
Dorothea Maetzel-Johannsen (1886–1930), portrait painter
Eva de Maizière (1915–2003), artist, sculptor and cellist
Melanie Manchot (born 1966), photographer and installation artist
Jeanne Mandello (1907–2001), photographer
Henriette Manigk (born 1968), painter
Maria Marc (1876–1953), painter, textile artist 
Hedwig Marquardt (1884–1969), ceramist and painter
Therese Maron (1725–1806), painter
Ellen Marx (born 1939), artist and author
Toni Mau (1917–1981), painter, graphic artist and educator
Susanna Mayr (1600–1674), Baroque painter
Josephine Meckseper (fl. 1990s), contemporary artist
Ada Mee (born 1946), multi-media artist
Else Meidner (1901–1987), painter 
Anna Maria Mengs (1751–1792), painter
Julia Charlotte Mengs (c.1730–c.1806), painter
Anne Menke (born 1967), German-American photographer
Adelheid Mers (born 1960), multi-disciplinary artist
Immeke Mitscherlich (1899–1985), textile artist
Paula Modersohn-Becker (1876–1907), Expressionist painter
Una H. Moehrke (born 1953), painter
Marg Moll (1884–1977), sculptor, painter and writer
Sabine Moritz (born 1969), painter and graphic designer
Hedda Morrison (1908–1991), photographer
Auguste Müller (1847–1930), woodcarver, toymaker
Karin Apollonia Müller (born 1963), contemporary artist
Gabriele Münter (1877–1962), Expressionist painter

N
Susanne von Nathusius (1850–1929), portrait painter
Renee Nele (born 1932), sculptor, goldsmith
Elisabet Ney (1833–1907), sculptor
Anja Niedringhaus (1965–2014), photojournalist
Margret Nissen (born 1938), photographer
Elisabeth Noltenius (1888–1964), painter 
Maria Nordman (born 1943), German-American sculptor, conceptual artist

O
Frédérique Émilie Auguste O'Connell (1823–1885), painter
Méret Oppenheim (1913–1985), German-born Swiss Surrealist artist, photographer
Hildegard Ochse (1935–1997), photographer
Li Osborne (1883–1968), German-born British photographer and sculptor
Anna Kerstin Otto (born 1972), painter
Justine Otto (born 1974), painter
Hermine Overbeck-Rohte (1869–1937), landscape painter

P
Cornelia Paczka-Wagner (1864–after 1930), painter
Amalia Pachelbel (1688–1723), painter and engraver
Louise Pagenkopf (1856–1922), landscape painter
Margarete Palz (born 1937), textile artist
Jeannette Papin (1761–1835), painter
Helga Paris (born 1938), photographer
Lina von Perbandt (1836–1884), landscape painter
Anna Peters (1843–1926), landscape and flower painter
Lilo Peters (1913–2001), painter and sculptor
Pietronella Peters (1848–1924), portrait painter
Carlotta Ida Popert (1848–1923), German-Italian watercolourist, etcher
Charlotte Posenenske (1930–1985), sculptor 
Bettina Pousttchi (born 1971), German-Iranian sculptor, photographer, filmmaker
Maria Katharina Prestel (1747–1794), painter, etcher 
Hermione von Preuschen (1854–1918), painter, writer
Emilie Preyer (1849–1930), painter
Barbara Probst (born 1964), German-American photographer
Anne-Katrin Purkiss (born 1959), photographer
Doramaria Purschian (1890–1972), Expressionist painter
Karin Putsch-Grassi (born 1960), potter

R
Doris Raab (1851–1933), print-maker
Erna Raabe (1882–1938), painter
Dorothee Raetsch (born 1940), sculptor, graphic artist
Katja Rahlwes (born 1967), fashion photographer
Katharina Rapp (born 1948), painter
Sandra Rauch (born 1967), painter
Hilla von Rebay (1890–1967), abstract artist, co-founder of the Guggenheim Museum
Anita Rée (1885–1933), avant-garde painter
Margaretha Reichardt (1907–1984), textile designer and former Bauhaus student
Margarethe von Reinken (1877–1962), painter
Claudia Reinhardt (born 1964), photographer
Christophine Reinwald (1757–1847), painter
Regina Relang (1906–1989), fashion photographer
Jack von Reppert-Bismarck (1903–1971), painter
Elisabeth Reuter (1853–1903), painter
Ottilie Reylaender (1882-1965), painter
Evelyn Richter (1930–2021), photographer
Ursula Richter (1886–1946), theatre photographer
Frieda Riess (1890–c .1955), portrait photographer
Adele Röder (born 1980), painter
Emy Roeder (1890–1971), sculptor
Ottilie Roederstein (1859–1937), painter
Rita Rohlfing (born 1964), painter, photographer and installation artist
Tata Ronkholz (1940–1997), photographer
Jelka Rosen (1868–1935), painter
Ulla Irina Rossek (born 1978), painter
Valeska Röver (1849–1931), painter
Julika Rudelius (born 1968), video and performance artist

S
Lessie Sachs (1897–1942), poet and artist
Adelaïde Salles-Wagner (1825–1890), painter active in France
Charlotte Salomon (1917–1943), painter
Christa Sammler (born 1932), sculptor
Eva Sandberg-Xiao (1911–2001), photographer
Agnes Sander-Plump (1888–1980), painter
Amalia von Schattenhofer (1763–1840), art collector and amateur painter
Silke Schatz (born 1967), sculptor, installation artist
Auguste Schepp (1846–1905), painter
Galka Scheyer (1889–1945), German-American painter, art collector and teacher
Ingrid Schmeck (born 1944), graphic artist
Gerda Schmidt-Panknin (1920–2021), painter
Julia Schmidt (born 1976), painter
Thyra Schmidt (born 1974), visual artist
Henriette Schneider (1747–1812), painter
Sophie Schneider (1866–1942), painter
Stefanie Schneider (born 1968), photographer
Doris Schoettler-Boll (1945–2015), artist, curator and teacher
Eva Schorr (1927–2016), painter and composer
Bertha Schrader (1845–1920), painter
Martina Schradi (born 1972), writer, cartoonist
Liselotte Schramm-Heckmann (1904–1995), painter
Käthe Schuftan (1899–1958), painter and draftsman
Anna Schuleit Haber (born 1974), visual artist
Ursula Schulz-Dornburg (born 1938), photographer
Martina Schumacher (born 1972), conceptual artist
Eva Schulze-Knabe (1907–1976), painter and graphic artist, resistance fighter
Regine Schumann (born 1961), contemporary painter and installation artist
Else Seifert (1879–1968), architectural photographer
Else Sehrig-Vehling (1897–1994), Expressionist painter
Louise Seidler (1786–1866), painter, custodian
Friederike Sieburg (1761–1835), pastellist
Alma Siedhoff-Buscher (1899–1944), designer
Katharina Sieverding (born 1944), photographer
Pola Sieverding (born 1981), photographer and video artist
Clara Siewert (1862–1945), Symbolist painter
Ludovike Simanowiz (1759–1827), portrait painter
Zuzanna Skiba (born 1968), painter
Maria Slavona (1865–1931), Impressionist painter
Kiki Smith (born 1954), West German born American sculptor, printmaker, drawer
Annegret Soltau (born 1946), visual artist
Margarethe Sömmering (1768–1802), painter
Kathrin Sonntag (born 1981), visual artist 
Catharina Sperling-Heckel (1699–1741), painter and etcher
Gertrud Staats (1859–1938), painter
Pia Stadthäuser (born 1959), sculptor 
Jonny Star (born 1964), sculptor, installation artist 
Birgit Stauch (born 1961), contemporary sculptor
Marél von Steinling (born 1933), painter
Hito Steyerl (born 1966), filmmaker, visual artist and writer
Dora Stock (1760–1832), painter
Minna Stocks (1846–1928), painter
Gunta Stölzl (1897–1983), textile artist
Madeleine Strindberg (born 1955), painter
Helene Marie Stromeyer (1834–1924), painter
Erika Stürmer-Alex (born 1938), painter

T
Gerda Taro (1910–1937), war photographer
Henriette-Félicité Tassaert (1766–1818), painter
Ebba Tesdorpf (1851–1920), illustrator and painter
Anna Dorothea Therbusch (1721–1782), Rococo painter
Ulrike Theusner (born 1982), printmaker
Elsa Thiemann (1910–1981), photographer
Amalie Tischbein (1757–1839), painter and etcher
Elisabeth Treskow (1898–1992), goldsmith
Catharina Treu (1743–1811), still life painter
Rosemarie Trockel (born 1952), contemporary artist
Alice Trübner (1875–1916), painter
Susanne Tunn (born 1958), sculptor

U
Ellen von Unwerth (born 1954), photographer

V
Lette Valeska (1885–1985), painter
Jutta Vialon (1917–2004), photographer
Clara Vogedes (1892–1983), painter
Christa Frieda Vogel (born 1960), photographer

W
Grete Waldau (born 1868), architectural painter, mural artist
Emmi Walther (1860–1936), painter
Maria Dorothea Wagner (1719–1792), painter
Corinne Wasmuht (born 1964), painter
Bertha Wehnert-Beckmann (1815–1901), Germany's first professional female photographer with a studio in Leipzig from 1843
Hanna Weil (1921–2011), painter
Gisela Weimann (born 1943), visual artist, feminist
Kaethe Katrin Wenzel (born 1972), contemporary artist
Anna Maria Werner (1688–1753), painter
Anna Werner (born 1941), photographer
Clara Westhoff (1878–1954), sculptor
Brigitta Westphal (born 1944), painter
Marianne Wex (born 1937), feminist photographer
Eva Janina Wieczorek (born 1951), painter
Anne Winterer (1894–1938), photographer
Lilli Wislicenus (1872–1939), sculptor
Herma Auguste Wittstock (born 1977), performance artist
Karla Woisnitza (born 1952), fresco painter
Ursula Wolff Schneider (1906–1977), photographer and photojournalist
Julie Wolfthorn (1864–1944), painter
Emmy Worringer (1878–1961), avant-garde artist

Y
Yva (1900–1944), Jewish photographer

Z
Wilhelmine von Zenge (1780–1852), pastellist
 Thekla Zielke (born 1928), ceramic artist
Margaretha Ziesenis (born c. 1740s), miniaturist
Dorothea Schwartz Zimmer (fl. 1800), portrait painter
Unica Zürn (1916–1970), artist and writer
Bettina von Zwehl (born 1971), photographer

See also
List of German women photographers

-
German women artists, List of
Artists
Artists